Terrorgram (sometimes stylised as TERRORGRAM) is a network of Telegram channels and accounts that subscribe to and promote militant accelerationism. Terrorgram channels are neo-fascist in ideology, and regularly share instructions and manuals on how to carry out acts of racially-motivated violence and anti-government, anti-authority terrorism. Terrorgram is a key communications forum for individuals and networks attached to Atomwaffen Division, The Base, and other explicit militant accelerationist groups.

In 2021, the Institute for Strategic Dialogue (ISD), an international think-tank, exposed more than 200 neo-Nazi pro-terrorism Telegram channels that make up the Terrorgram network, many of which contained instructions to build weapons and bombs.

Origins 
A major influence on Terrorgram is the neo-Nazi web forum Iron March, linked to both the proscribed UK-based group National Action, and the US-founded Atomwaffen Division. Despite having little over 1,200 users when it shut down in November 2017, Iron March, as a forum, has had an outsized influence on modern neo-Nazism. It popularised the book Siege by American neo-Nazi James Mason, a work promoting the establishment of underground, leaderless terrorist cells, working towards destabilising society and ushering in revolution. Iron March was also key in the development of the “terrorwave” aesthetic, a distinctive form of visual propaganda that communicates a message of terrorist violence. Rendered in red, white and black, the style often incorporates images of historical fascists, terrorists or paramilitaries wearing skull masks, with esoteric far-right symbols and simplistic slogans, such as "TRAITORS WILL HANG" and "RAPE THE POLICE". There is also a strong strain of esotericism and occultism woven into Terrorgram propaganda, lending a mystic sheen to the movement. Esoteric Hitlerism is frequently referenced.

Sanctification 

The Global Network on Extremism and Technology refers to Terrorgram and the broader ecosystem that it belongs to as "a 'dark fandom' that venerates and valorizes extreme-right terrorists as 'saints' and 'martyrs' in a manner similar to the heroization of school shooters and serial killers." In the event of an accelerationist, supremacist or neo-Nazi attack, Terrorgram sees the members of the collective engaged in the search for signs attesting to the ideological closeness in order to sanctify the attacker. The sanctification of a terrorist leads to their entry into the pantheon of terrorist-saints that are taken as models by Terrorgram. Among these, some can be identified who can be considered as founders of the ideological core, so-called founding saints: Brenton Tarrant, Theodore Kaczynski, Anders Breivik, Timothy McVeigh, and Dylann Roof. The five criteria required to become a saint include being of white race, conducting a deliberate attack, having motive to kill those who "threaten the white race," a "score" of killing at least one, and sharing the ideology of white supremacy.

Publications 
Following the ideological standard of Siege and The Turner Diaries, detailed instructions for attacking critical infrastructure are found in white supremacist manuals and propaganda distributed over Terrorgram channels. Terrorgram issued the third instalment of a digital magazine series called Hard Reset which glorifies white supremacist attacks and gives explanations for sector-specific critical infrastructure targeting.

In mid-June 2021, a group of right-wing extremists collectively produced A Terrorgram Publication, a 136-page guide online with the title Militant Accelerationism: A Collective Handbook consisting of detailed incitements for attacks on critical infrastructure and violence against minorities, police, public figures, journalists and other perceived enemies. In December 2021, the Terrorgram collective published a second document called 'Do It for the 'Gram''. The 268-page, multi-author document contains ideological sections that stem from accelerationism, white supremacy, and eco-fascism, together with practical instructions on how to facilitate the collapse of Western society.

A 24-minute video titled White Terror, made by Terrorgram, was originally released on October 14, 2022. It celebrates dozens of individuals who committed acts of violence and terrorism from 1968 to the present against the government, police officers, women, Jews, Muslims, Sikhs, immigrants, people of color, LGBTQ people, leftists, journalists, and medical professionals. In addition to praising the perpetrators and referring to them as "saints," the video encourages further acts of terrorism, stating that future attacks will be honored. The video contains footage taken from the 2019 Christchurch shooting and 2022 Buffalo attack videos in addition to news clips.

See also 
 2022 Bratislava shooting, shooter was member of the Terrorgram and cited it in his manifesto
 Ecofascism - Association with violence
 Right-wing terrorism

References

Citations 

Accelerationism
Alt-right Internet forums
Alt-right terrorism
Neo-fascist terrorism
Neo-Nazi websites
Political Internet forums
Telegram (software)
Terrorism in Europe
Terrorism in the United States